The 1973 Oklahoma State Cowboys football team represented Oklahoma State University in the Big Eight Conference during the 1973 NCAA Division I football season. In their first season under head coach Jim Stanley, the Cowboys compiled a 5–4–2 record (2–3–2 against conference opponents), finished in fifth place in the conference, and outscored opponents by a combined total of 303 to 186.

The team's statistical leaders included Brent Blackman with 809 rushing yards and 602 passing yards and Reuben Gant with 447 receiving yards.

The team played its home games at Lewis Field in Stillwater, Oklahoma.

Schedule

After the season

The 1974 NFL Draft was held on January 29–30, 1974. The following Cowboys were selected.

References

Oklahoma State
Oklahoma State Cowboys football seasons
Oklahoma State Cowboys football